Schønning is a surname. Notable people with the surname include:

Klaus Schønning (born 1954), Danish musician
Soffi Schønning (1895–1994), Norwegian operatic soprano

Surnames of Scandinavian origin